Lonsilocher Canal is a stream in the U.S. state of Mississippi. 
 
Lonsilocher is a name derived from the Choctaw language purported tom mean "border of a swamp" or "black swamp".

References

Rivers of Mississippi
Rivers of Neshoba County, Mississippi
Mississippi placenames of Native American origin